Aleksandr Kalnitzhenko is a Soviet sprint canoer who competed in the early 1980s. He won a silver medal in the C-2 500 m event at the 1986 ICF Canoe Sprint World Championships in Montreal.

References

Living people
Soviet male canoeists
Year of birth missing (living people)
Russian male canoeists
ICF Canoe Sprint World Championships medalists in Canadian